William Alfred Kirchenbauer (born February 19, 1953) is an American actor and stand-up comedian who has appeared in television shows and films since the late 1970s, most notably performing as a regular on Make Me Laugh and Fernwood 2 Night. As an actor, he is best known for his role as Coach Graham Lubbock on the series Growing Pains and starring in the spin-off series Just the Ten of Us.

Life and career
Kirchenbauer was born in Salzburg, Austria, the son of Hester Elaine (née Andrews) and Alfred Ellsworth Kirchenbauer, who served in the U.S. Army. Kirchenbauer's documentary, Taking Al Back Home is a comedic story of a final road trip with his father, twenty five years after his death.

In 1978, Connie Stevens introduced Kirchenbauer for his stand-up appearance on Season 1, Episode 24 of The Comedy Shop hosted by Norm Crosby.  Using items on stage in innovative ways, the mic stand became a giant rubber-tipped dart and he became chewing gum which ended up stuck on the bottom of the barstool to the amusement and laughter of the studio audience.

Kirchenbauer has had recurring roles on Fernwood 2 Night and America 2-Night as singer Tony Rolletti; on Mork & Mindy as the geeky, obnoxious self-professed "ladies' man", womanizer Todd Norman "T.N.T." Taylor; and on Clueless as Coach Bullock. He was a semi-regular panelist on the revival of Match Game in 1990 and Super Password.
 
Kirchenbauer has also appeared in movies such as Gorp, Stoogemania, The Story of Us, The Alternate, Unbeatable Harold and the 1984 Gallagher comedy special, Melon Crazy.

Television credits
Kirchenbauer guest starred on an episode of Mork and Mindy in 1979.

References

External links
 
 

1953 births
American people of Austrian descent
American stand-up comedians
American male television actors
Living people